Alexi Stival (born 7 June 1963), known as Cuca, is a Brazilian professional football coach and former player.

Cuca played as a forward, winning Campeonato Gaúcho titles for Grêmio and Internacional, while also featuring for Palmeiras and Santos, among others. He made one appearance for the Brazil national team in 1991.

Since his retirement, Cuca has been the head coach of a number of clubs, mostly in his native country. He has led nine of the Big 12, winning the Campeonato Brasileiro Série A with Palmeiras in 2016 and Atlético Mineiro in 2021, and also lifting the 2013 Copa Libertadores with the latter.

Personal life
Born in Curitiba, Paraná, Cuca started playing football to help covering the expenses of a heart surgery for his father Dirceu. His nickname Cuca was created by his older brother Amauri: their parents used to mock Amauri when the boy was fooling around by saying that the city's police officer, nicknamed Cucla, would catch him on the act; once the little brother arrived at home and was described as "very handsome" by their mother, Amauri, in an attempt to mock his brother, called him Cuca in a reference to the police officer Cucla, not knowing that his nickname had an L.

Cuca is married to Rejane since 1985, and has two daughters, Maiara and Natasha. He is a practising Roman Catholic. Cuca's younger brother Cuquinha was also a footballer; a midfielder, he only had a short career before starting to work as his assistant in 1999. Their elder brother, Amauri, was a central defender who also played professionally.

In 1987, while playing a tournament in Switzerland with Grêmio, Cuca and three other teammates were arrested for 28 days for allegedly raping a 13-year-old girl in a hotel room in Bern. Two of the players admitted to having sex with the girl, but claimed that the encounter was consensual and that they were unaware that she was underaged; Cuca and the other teammate denied participating in the act. Forensic examination found no evidence of violence, and the four were released on bail and allowed to return to Brazil. Despite Cuca not being identified by the accuser as one of the offenders, he was convicted in absentia two years later by a Swiss court to 15 months imprisonment for "engaging in sexual act with a minor". The sentence was not served and expired in 2004.

On 7 November 2020, while coaching Santos, Cuca tested positive for COVID-19, being immediately transferred to the Hospital Sírio-Libanês.

Playing career

Club
Cuca started his career with Santa Cruz-RS after graduating with hometown side Pinheiros. He moved to Juventude in May 1985, and was a regular starter for the club until his transfer to Grêmio in July 1987.

While at Grêmio, Cuca scored the decisive goal of the 1989 Copa do Brasil Final against Sport Recife. He moved abroad for the first time in his career in August 1990, spending six months at La Liga side Real Valladolid.

Upon returning to Brazil, Cuca joined Grêmio's fierce rivals Internacional on loan. After struggling with injuries, he featured regularly for Palmeiras and Santos.

Cuca was signed by Portuguesa ahead of the 1994 season on loan, but failed to impress. He subsequently represented Remo, Juventude and Chapecoense, retiring with the latter in 1996 at the age of 33.

International
Cuca played one game for the Brazilian national team on 27 February 1991, against Paraguay, at Morenão, Campo Grande.

Coaching career
Shortly after retiring, Cuca started coaching Uberlândia in 1998. He was subsequently in charge of Avaí (two stints), Brasil de Pelotas, Internacional de Limeira, Internacional de Lages, Remo, Criciúma, Gama, Paraná and Goiás, gaining notoriety with the latter after taking the latter club in the last position of the 2003 Campeonato Brasileiro Série A and avoiding relegation by finishing ninth.

On 17 December 2003, Cuca was appointed head coach of São Paulo in the place of Roberto Rojas. He was dismissed the following 2 September, after being knocked out of the year's Copa Libertadores in the semifinals and dropping to the seventh place in the league. Eight days after leaving São Paulo, he was named Grêmio head coach, but could not avoid the club's first-ever relegation.

On 3 February 2005, Cuca replaced Júlio César Leal at the helm of Flamengo, Dismissed on 15 April, he took over Coritiba on 6 May. He was sacked by Coxa on 12 October 2005, being subsequently appointed in charge of São Caetano on 9 November.

On 22 May 2006, Cuca was presented as the new Botafogo head coach. He resigned on 28 September 2007, but returned to the club on 7 October after the departure of Mário Sérgio; he resigned for a second time on 29 May 2008.

Cuca was appointed Santos head coach on 2 June 2008, but resigned on 7 August after the club was seriously threatened with relegation. He returned to Flamengo on 12 December, after a two-month spell at Fluminense, but was relieved from his duties the following 23 July.

Cuca returned to Flu on 1 September 2009, replacing Renato Gaúcho. Sacked on 19 April of the following year, he took over Cruzeiro on 8 June 2010 and managed to lead the club to a second place, two points shy of champions and former club Fluminense. He left the side on 19 June 2011, being replaced by Joel Santana.

On 8 August 2011, Cuca was announced as new head coach of Atlético Mineiro, replacing Dorival Júnior. He won the 2012 Campeonato Mineiro and also lifted the 2013 Copa Libertadores, but on 18 December 2013, after a 3–1 defeat to Raja Casablanca, he was dismissed.

On 21 December 2013, just three days after being sacked by Galo, Cuca was appointed at the helm of Chinese Super League side Shandong Luneng. He announced his departure from the club on 6 December 2015, after winning the Chinese FA Cup and the Chinese FA Super Cup.

On 14 March 2016, Cuca replaced Marcelo Oliveira at the helm of high-spending Palmeiras. He led the club to a Série A title after 22 years, but opted to resign on 30 November, alleging "personal reasons".

Cuca returned to Verdão on 5 May 2017, replacing fired Eduardo Baptista and signing a contract until the end of 2018. On 13 October, he was himself dismissed, with his assistant Alberto Valentim taking his place.

On 30 July 2018, Cuca was appointed head coach of Santos for the second time. He took the club out of the relegation zone, but left after finishing in a disappointing tenth position due to a health problem.

On 14 February 2019, Cuca agreed to a two-year contract with São Paulo, effective as of 15 April due to his heart condition. He resigned on 26 September, and returned to Santos on 7 August 2020. He led the latter to the final of the 2020 Copa Libertadores, where he lost and was sent off late in the game.

In February 2021, shortly after losing the Libertadores final, Cuca announced his departure from Santos at the end of the season when his contract expired, alleging 'mental exhaustion'. His departure was officially announced by the club on 21 February, after qualifying the club to the 2021 Libertadores.

On 5 March 2021, Cuca agreed to a two-year deal with Atlético Mineiro, returning to the club after seven years. He led the side to one of the most successful seasons in their history, winning the domestic treble and ending a 50-year streak since their last Campeonato Brasileiro title. He also equaled Levir Culpi's record as Atlético's most decorated head coach, with six titles. His departure was announced on 28 December 2021, due to personal reasons.

On 23 July 2022, Cuca returned to Atlético Mineiro, signing a four-month contract. He left on a mutual agreement on 14 November, after only 21 matches.

Career statistics

Club

International

Coaching statistics

Honours

Player
Grêmio
Copa do Brasil: 1989
Campeonato Gaúcho: 1989, 1990

Internacional
Campeonato Gaúcho: 1991

Chapecoense
Campeonato Catarinense: 1996

Manager
Flamengo
Campeonato Carioca: 2009

Cruzeiro
Campeonato Mineiro: 2011

Atlético Mineiro
Campeonato Mineiro: 2012, 2013, 2021
Copa Libertadores: 2013
Campeonato Brasileiro Série A: 2021
Copa do Brasil: 2021

Shandong Luneng
Chinese FA Cup: 2014
Chinese FA Super Cup: 2015

Palmeiras
Campeonato Brasileiro Série A: 2016

Individual
Campeonato Brasileiro Série A Coach of the Year: 2016, 2021
Bola de Prata Best Coach: 2016, 2021

References

External links
 

1963 births
Living people
Brazilian Roman Catholics
Footballers from Curitiba
Brazilian footballers
Association football forwards
Esporte Clube Pinheiros (PR) players
Futebol Clube Santa Cruz players
Esporte Clube Juventude players
Grêmio Foot-Ball Porto Alegrense players
Real Valladolid players
Sport Club Internacional players
Sociedade Esportiva Palmeiras players
Santos FC players
Associação Portuguesa de Desportos players
Clube do Remo players
Associação Chapecoense de Futebol players
Coritiba Foot Ball Club players
Campeonato Brasileiro Série A players
La Liga players
Brazil international footballers
Brazilian expatriate footballers
Brazilian expatriate sportspeople in Spain
Expatriate footballers in Spain
Brazilian football managers
People convicted of statutory rape offenses
Uberlândia Esporte Clube managers
Avaí FC managers
Grêmio Esportivo Brasil managers
Associação Atlética Internacional (Limeira) managers
Clube do Remo managers
Esporte Clube Internacional de Lages managers
Sociedade Esportiva do Gama managers
Criciúma Esporte Clube managers
Paraná Clube managers
Goiás Esporte Clube managers
São Paulo FC managers
Grêmio Foot-Ball Porto Alegrense managers
CR Flamengo managers
Coritiba Foot Ball Club managers
Associação Desportiva São Caetano managers
Botafogo de Futebol e Regatas managers
Santos FC managers
Fluminense FC managers
Cruzeiro Esporte Clube managers
Clube Atlético Mineiro managers
Shandong Taishan F.C. managers
Sociedade Esportiva Palmeiras managers
Campeonato Brasileiro Série A managers
Chinese Super League managers
Brazilian expatriate football managers
Brazilian expatriate sportspeople in China
Expatriate football managers in China